Dieter Fersch (born 10 January 1946 in Bad Hindelang) is a retired German alpine skier who competed in the 1968 Winter Olympics.

See also
History of skiing

References

External links
 sports-reference.com

1946 births
Living people
German male alpine skiers
Olympic alpine skiers of West Germany
Alpine skiers at the 1968 Winter Olympics
20th-century German people